JTF is an abbreviation of Joint Task Force. 

JTF may also refer to:

Jewish Task Force
John Templeton Foundation
Joint Task Force (video game)